Ffarmers is a village near Lampeter, in the north of Carmarthenshire, Wales. It was named after the old "Farmers' Arms" public house, which is now closed. The double "f" in the name comes from the Welsh language spelling of the "f" sound in "farmers". The village stands on the old Roman road, Sarn Helen, which was used by cattle drovers to take their livestock from Wales to Smithfield market in London.

The small rivers Afon Twrch and Afon Fanafas flow to the south of the village and join the River Tywi between Llandeilo and Carmarthen.

See also
Word-initial ff

External links
Ffarmers Community website

Villages in Carmarthenshire